Mi novia está de madre is a Dominican comedy movie released in the summer of 2007.  The film stars Roberto Salcedo, Mexican actress Patricia Manterola, and merengue singer Eddy Herrera.

References

2007 films
Dominican Republic comedy films
2007 comedy films